Sir Greville Douglas Spratt, GBE, TD, JP, DL (1 May 1927 – 13 December 2012) was a British underwriter who was the 660th Lord Mayor of London from 1987 to 1988.

Biography 
Spratt was educated at Leighton Park School, Charterhouse School, and the Royal Military Academy Sandhurst. He served with the Coldstream Guards from 1945 to 1946, before being commissioned into the Oxfordshire and Buckinghamshire Light Infantry. He was seconded into the Arab Legion from 1946 to 1948.

After leaving the Army, he joined the Infantry Battalion of the Honourable Artillery Company as a private, before being commissioned in the HAC in 1950. He was appointed commanding officer of the HAC in 1962, with the rank of lieutenant colonel. He was Regimental Colonel from 1966 to 1970 and again in 1978. He was Aide-de-Camp to the Queen from 1973 to 1978.
Spratt joined Lloyd’s as an underwriter in 1950.

References 

1927 births
2012 deaths
Knights Grand Cross of the Order of the British Empire
20th-century lord mayors of London
British Army officers
People educated at Leighton Park School
People educated at Charterhouse School
Graduates of the Royal Military Academy Sandhurst
Oxfordshire and Buckinghamshire Light Infantry officers
Honourable Artillery Company soldiers
Honourable Artillery Company officers
Insurance underwriters
Deputy Lieutenants of Greater London